Eega is a 2012 Indian bilingual fantasy film written by V. Vijayendra Prasad and directed by his son, S. S. Rajamouli. It was produced by Korrapati Ranganatha Sai Varahi Chalana Chitram with an estimated budget of 260 to 400 million, and was made simultaneously in Telugu and Tamil, the latter as Naan Ee (I, Housefly). The film stars Sudeep, Nani, and Samantha Ruth Prabhu. M. M. Keeravani composed the soundtrack and score. K. K. Senthil Kumar was director of photography and Kotagiri Venkateswara Rao edited the film. Janardhan Maharshi and Crazy Mohan wrote the dialogue for the Telugu and Tamil versions, respectively.

The narrative of Eega is in the form of a bedtime story told by a father to his daughter. Its protagonist is Nani, who is in love with his neighbour Bindu. Nani is murdered by a wealthy businessman named Sudeep, who is attracted to Bindu and considers Nani a rival. Nani reincarnates as a housefly and tries to protect Bindu while avenging his death.

The idea for the film originated in the 1990s from a conversation in which Prasad joked with Rajamouli about the idea of a fly seeking revenge against a human. Rajamouli reconsidered the idea after finishing Maryada Ramanna (2010), and Prasad developed it into a script. The film's production began on 7 December 2010 at Ramanaidu Studios in Hyderabad. Principal photography began on 22 February 2011 and continued until late February 2012. Makuta VFX and Annapurna Studios oversaw Eega visual effects and digital intermediate process, respectively.

The two versions of the film, alongside a Malayalam-dubbed version titled Eecha, were released on 6 July 2012 in approximately 1,100 screens globally. The performances of the principal cast, Rajamouli's direction, and visual effects received critical acclaim upon release. Eega was one of the highest-grossing Telugu film of the year, earning more than 1.25 billion. Its Hindi-dubbed version, Makkhi, which was released on 12 October 2012, was not as commercially successful as the others. Eega won two National Film Awards (Best Feature Film in Telugu and Best Special Effects), five Filmfare Awards, and three South Indian International Movie Awards. It was screened at the Toronto After Dark Film Festival, the Shanghai International Film Festival, and the Madrid International Film Festival.

Awards and nominations

References

External links
 Accolades for Eega at the Internet Movie Database

Lists of accolades by Indian film